Eric Miller Reeves (born October 18, 1963) is an attorney and a North Carolina state Senator.

Early life and education
Reeves graduated from St. Mark's School of Texas in 1982 where he was a member of the wrestling team and won the Texas State Championship.

Reeves received a bachelor's degree in history from Duke University in 1986 and a Juris Doctor (J.D.) degree from Wake Forest University in 1989.

Career

Reeves practiced law in Raleigh and was elected to Raleigh City Council in 1993, serving two terms.

He was elected to the North Carolina State Senate in 1996 as a Democrat, representing the state's fourteenth – later sixteenth – district. He went on to chair the Senate's technology committee, served as chair of Human Services Appropriations and on the Education Oversight Committee.

Reeves also served as co-chair of the Senate Information Technology Committee. He resigned from his chair in 2004 after serving four terms as a state Senator.

Reeves is the General Counsel and Director of Public Affairs for SchoolDude.com, a provider of software management tools for Educational Facilities.

References

External links

|-

North Carolina state senators
Raleigh City Council members
Duke University Trinity College of Arts and Sciences alumni
Wake Forest University alumni
1963 births
Living people
21st-century American politicians